Jacques Marcault (7 December 1883 – 18 January 1979) was a French cyclist. He competed in two events at the 1912 Summer Olympics.

References

External links
 

1883 births
1979 deaths
French male cyclists
Olympic cyclists of France
Cyclists at the 1912 Summer Olympics
Cyclists from Paris